The Nooksack language (Lhéchalosem, or Lhéchelesem) is a Salishan language spoken by the Nooksack people of the Pacific Northwest Coast. It comes from the area now known as northwestern Washington (state) in Whatcom County, United States.

The Nooksack language has only one fluent speaker as of 2020. Nooksack is most closely related to Squamish, Sháshíshálhem (Sechelt) and Halkomelem, which are all spoken in nearby parts of British Columbia, Canada. Some researchers have questioned whether the Nooksack language is simply a divergent dialect of Halkomelem, but research has proved that Nooksack is in fact a distinct language.

Usage and revitalization efforts 
In the 1970s, the Salishan linguist Brent Galloway, worked closely with the last remaining native speaker, Sindick Jimmy, who died in 1988. He was compiling a dictionary of the language, and his book, Nooksack place names: geography, culture, and language, appeared in 2011. The Nooksack tribe has offered classes in the language. As of 2020, one fluent speaker remained, a Nooksack tribal member who has been part of the Lhéchalosem Teacher Training Language Immersion Project.

Students will spend mornings in language immersion, and afternoons working on special projects, focusing on the language use in one aspect of local native culture such as fishing or crafts. After two years, the students will obtain a certificate similar to an Associate Degree, and after four years they will be fully qualified language teachers, with the equivalent of a Bachelor of Arts. The aim is to revive the use of the Lhéchalosem language in all aspects of daily life. The program has an annual budget of $110,000, with 60 percent funded by the Administration for Native Americans (ANA) and 40 percent funded by the Nooksack Tribe.

Phonology

Vowels
The following table includes all the vowel sounds found in the Nooksack language.

Consonants
The following table includes all the consonant sounds found in the Nooksack language.

Orthography

In addition, the diacritic "ː" indicates that the preceding sound is long (e.g.). An acute accent (´) is placed on the accented syllable.

References

Nooksack Tribe page

External links 
Vocabulary Words in Native American Languages: Nooksack
OLAC resources in and about the Nooksack language

Coast Salish languages
Endangered languages
Languages of the United States
Nooksack
Native American language revitalization
Indigenous languages of the Pacific Northwest Coast
Indigenous languages of Washington (state)